The Franklyn Range is a small mountain range in southwestern British Columbia, Canada, located on the west side of the entrance to Loughborough Inlet, north of Johnstone Strait northeast of Sayward. It has an area of 44 km2 and is a subrange of the Pacific Ranges which in turn form part of the Coast Mountains.

See also
List of mountain ranges

References

Pacific Ranges